Baishiqiaonan is an interchange station on Line 6 and Line 9 of the Beijing Subway. This station opened on December 30, 2012.

Station Layout 
Both the line 6 and 9 stations have underground island platforms. The line 6 platforms are located a level under the line 9 platforms.

Exits 
There are 5 exits, lettered A, B, C, E and G. Exits C and G are accessible.

Gallery

References

External links
 

Railway stations in China opened in 2012
Beijing Subway stations in Haidian District